Richard Worsam Meade III (also called Richard Worsam Meade, Jr., by many sources) (October 9, 1837 – May 4, 1897) was an officer in the United States Navy during the American Civil War.

Biography
Born in New York City, he was the son of Captain Richard Worsam Meade II, USN, and followed his father by entering the Navy on October 2, 1850.

He was attached to the steam frigate  of the Mediterranean Squadron in 1851–1854, and the sailing frigate  in the Home Squadron in 1854–1855, before attending the United States Naval Academy in 1856. He was promoted to passed midshipman on June 20, 1856. He served in the steam frigate  in 1856–1857, and off Africa in 1857–1859 on board the corvette  and the sloop of war . Promoted to Lieutenant on January 23, 1858, Meade was an officer of the steamer  and sailing sloop of war , both units of the Pacific Squadron, during 1859–1861.

After returning to the East Coast from the Pacific in mid-1861, Lieutenant Meade was hospitalized for a few months for a tropical illness, then provided gunnery instruction to volunteer officers as the Navy expanded to meet the challenges of the American Civil War. In January 1862 he became executive officer of the steam sloop  and later held the same position on the new gunboat .

Meade's post-Civil War career marked him as one of the Navy's most prominent reformist and technologically minded officers. Duty at the Naval Academy in 1865–1868 was followed by promotion to Commander and service along the Alaskan coast as commanding officer of the steamer . In 1871–1873 he took  on a lengthy diplomatic and information-gathering cruise through the south Pacific. During the rest of the 1870s he served ashore at Washington, D.C., and New York. He attained the rank of Captain while commanding  in the North Atlantic and West Indies in 1879–1882, then had additional shore duty and commanded the new dispatch vessel . Captain Meade was Commandant of the Washington Navy Yard in 1887–1890. Promoted to Commodore in 1892 and Rear Admiral two years later, his final service was as commander of the North Atlantic Squadron in 1894–1895.

His 1891 article "George Meade, a Patriot of the Revolutionary Era", was a "hagiographic account" that strongly influenced the reputation of his great-grandfather. He was a member of the Military Order of the Loyal Legion of the United States, the Society of Colonial Wars and the Military Order of Foreign Wars.

Meade's early retirement in May 1895 followed a series of disagreements with the Navy Department. An article in the New York Tribune reported Meade as criticizing President Grover Cleveland, and quoted the sentence "I am an American and a Union man, two things this administration can't stand."

Rear Admiral Meade died in Washington, D.C., on May 4, 1897 after complications following an operation for appendicitis. He is buried in Arlington National Cemetery alongside his brother, Lieutenant Commander Henry Meigs Meade, USN.

His wife, Rebecca Paulding, was the daughter of Rear Admiral Hiram Paulding.

Namesakes

Two ships have been named  for him and his brother, Brigadier General Robert Leamy Meade, USMC. They were nephews of General George Gordon Meade.

References

1837 births
1897 deaths
Military personnel from New York City
United States Navy admirals
United States Naval Academy alumni
Union Navy officers
People of New York (state) in the American Civil War
Burials at Arlington National Cemetery
Meade family